The Billboard Hot 100 is a chart that ranks the best singles of the United States. Published by Billboard magazine, the data are compiled by Nielsen SoundScan based collectively on each single's weekly physical sales and airplays. There were 15 singles that topped the chart this year. The first of these, "I'm Your Angel" by R. Kelly and Celine Dion, spent two weeks at the top, concluding a six-week run that had begun in December 1998.

During the year, 11 acts had achieved a first U.S. number-one single, including: Britney Spears, Ricky Martin, Jennifer Lopez, Destiny’s Child, Dru Hill, Kool Moe Dee, Christina Aguilera, Enrique Iglesias, Jay-Z, Santana, and Rob Thomas. The longest running number-one single is "Smooth" by Santana featuring Matchbox Twenty frontman Rob Thomas, which attained 12 weeks at number-one. Ten of those weeks were logged in 1999 and two additional weeks were logged in 2000.

TLC was the only act with more than one number one song, with them hitting the top twice.

Chart history

Number-one artists

See also
1999 in music
List of Billboard number-one singles
Billboard Year-End Hot 100 singles of 1999
List of Billboard Hot 100 top 10 singles in 1999

References

Additional sources
Fred Bronson's Billboard Book of Number 1 Hits, 5th Edition
Joel Whitburn's Top Pop Singles 1955-2008, 12 Edition
Joel Whitburn Presents the Billboard Hot 100 Charts: The Nineties
Additional information obtained can be verified within Billboard's online archive services and print editions of the magazine.

1999 record charts
1999